Terminal is the sixth and final novel in the Tunnels series, published in UK on 6 May 2013.

Plot summary

The book begins with Jiggs in the inner world discovering that Drake is still alive, but has been affected by the nuclear radiation from the explosion at the end of Spiral. He also finds the burnt body of Rebecca One lying near Drake. Jiggs rescues Drake and carries him to the Topsoil. At the same time, Elliott and Will are trapped in the inner world, in the destroyed city of New Germania. They meet three New Germanians who have survived the virus released in the inner world and, along with them and a Bushman called Woody, they go to explore one of the Pyramids from the jungle. Also, they find out that the Bushmen are part Styx (because they speak the Styx language at a much higher pitch). After they get into the Pyramid, something unexpected happens as Elliott touches a trident sign (like the ones that Dr. Burrows and Will found on their first exploration of the Pyramid). The Pyramid vanishes into thin air and an enormous tower appears out of nowhere in the jungle. Elliott senses that there is something missing from the tower, then she and Will find out that at the top of the tower there is a portal to Topsoil, and so they teleport themselves to London.

Meanwhile, Chester is Topsoil with Stephanie, Old Wilkie, and Parry. Still grieving over the deaths of his parents during Professor Danforth's betrayal in the previous book, he discovers that Parry is still allied with Danforth and the death of his parents was being part of a plan. He then runs away from the others with Martha.

Danforth is infiltrated within the Styx, but he soon finds out that, after he is no longer needed, he is sentenced to death by the Styx. He manages to save his life, taking prisoners Rebecca Two and her crush (Franz, the New Germanian driver).

Now that they are finally Topsoil, Will and Elliott go to the British Museum because Elliott feels that she might find something very important there. She proves to be right and she finds a sceptre emanating a blue glow. When she and Will want to get out of the museum, they find themselves surrounded by Armagi. A tank driven by Drake and Jiggs suddenly appears. Elliott is saved, but Will is caught by the Styx.  Elliott senses that she has to go to St. Paul's Cathedral, as she somehow knows that by doing this she might put an end to the threat of the Armagi, who seem to be moving towards the rest of the world to conquer it.

While Elliott, Drake and Jiggs are inside St. Paul's, Parry, Danforth and his team are watching them from the buildings around. As Danforth goes towards St. Paul's, trying to get through the Armagi, he is surrounded by Chester, Stephanie and Martha. Chester tries to kill Danforth but he is stopped by Stephanie and Martha. He gets angry and says some rude words to Martha, who kills him with her crossbow, then is elevated in the air and taken away by the Brights.

Elliott uses the sceptre and the dome of St. Paul's disappears just like the Pyramid from the inner world. Some Styx (including Rebecca Two and Alex) appear, carrying Will as a prisoner. Alex lays her eggs inside Will, in the view of everyone. As he tries to save Will, Drake gets shot and killed by two Limiters. Saving the situation, Elliott strikes the ground with the sceptre and all of the Armagi and Styx (including Elliott) get teleported inside the inner world, where they will all be killed by the virus, except for the vaccinated Elliott.

At the end of the book, Will finds himself inside a topsoil hospital, reunited with his mother and with Bartleby, one of the original Bartleby's kittens, who resembles his father. Elliott, who was trapped inside the Tower from the inner world, puts the sceptre in its place in the tower and suddenly the earth starts to move and get away from the Solar System. It is revealed that the Earth is a huge spaceship sent on a mission and, because the sceptre was stolen, the spaceship remained trapped in the Solar system. Now that the sceptre is again in its place, Earth starts its journey again towards Home. Will also finds out that, even though the eggs were removed, they may have turned him into a Styx.

References

Kirkus review
The Guardian review

External links
Tunnels Official Website
Tunnels Chicken House Publishing Ltd.

2013 British novels
2013 science fiction novels
English novels
Ancient astronauts in fiction
Biological weapons in popular culture
Fictional civilizations
Hollow Earth in fiction
Lost world novels
Nazi fugitives in popular culture
Novels set in subterranea
Teleportation in fiction
Subterranean Press books